Idyla is a genus of gastropods belonging to the family Clausiliidae.

The species of this genus are found in Southern Europe, Western Asia and North America.

Species:

Idyla aydinensis 
Idyla bicristata 
Idyla castalia 
Idyla liebegottae 
Idyla pelobsoleta

References

Clausiliidae